Cantharellula umbonata is a species of fungus in the genus Cantharellula. It is common in eastern North America, particularly in summer and autumn. It is associated with Polytrichum and other mosses found in the southeastern United States. It is edible, and best when young.

References

External links

 
 

Edible fungi
Fungi described in 1792
Fungi of North America
Hygrophoraceae